Conus muriculatus, common name the muricate cone, is a species of sea snail, a marine gastropod mollusk in the family Conidae, the cone snails and their allies.

Like all species within the genus Conus, these snails are predatory and venomous. They are capable of "stinging" humans, therefore live ones should be handled carefully or not at all.

Description
The size of an adult shell varies between 15 mm and 50 mm. The solid shell has straight sides, and a short conical spire. The shoulder is sharply angulated and tuberculated. The body whorl is strongly striate towards the base, encircled throughout with lines of granules. The color of the shell is white, violet-tinged towards the base, with two light chestnut or yellowish brown, broad, irregular and somewhat indistinct bands.

Distribution
This species occurs in the Indian Ocean off Madagascar, the Mascarene Basin to Western Australia; in the Pacific Ocean from Japan to New Caledonia, Fiji, the Solomon Islands, Tonga, Vanuatu and French Polynesia; off Australia (New South Wales, Queensland).

References

 Reeve, L.A. 1843. Descriptions of new species of shells figured in the 'Conchologia Iconica'. Proceedings of the Zoological Society of London 11: 169–197
 Cernohorsky, W.O. 1978. Tropical Pacific Marine Shells. Sydney : Pacific Publications 352 pp., 68 pls.
 Wilson, B. 1994. Australian Marine Shells. Prosobranch Gastropods. Kallaroo, WA : Odyssey Publishing Vol. 2 370 pp. 
 Röckel, D., Korn, W. & Kohn, A.J. 1995. Manual of the Living Conidae. Volume 1: Indo-Pacific Region. Wiesbaden : Hemmen 517 pp.
 Filmer R.M. (2001). A Catalogue of Nomenclature and Taxonomy in the Living Conidae 1758 – 1998. Backhuys Publishers, Leiden. 388pp
 Tucker J.K. (2009). Recent cone species database. September 4, 2009 Edition
 Tucker J.K. & Tenorio M.J. (2009) Systematic classification of Recent and fossil conoidean gastropods. Hackenheim: Conchbooks. 296 pp
  Petit, R. E. (2009). George Brettingham Sowerby, I, II & III: their conchological publications and molluscan taxa. Zootaxa. 2189: 1–218

Gallery

External links
 The Conus Biodiversity website
 
 Cone Shells – Knights of the Sea
 Puillandre N., Duda T.F., Meyer C., Olivera B.M. & Bouchet P. (2015). One, four or 100 genera? A new classification of the cone snails. Journal of Molluscan Studies. 81: 1–23

muriculatus
Gastropods described in 1833
Taxa named by George Brettingham Sowerby I